Elachista helia is a moth in the family Elachistidae. It was described by Lauri Kaila and Sruoga in 2014. It is found only on Rhodes in Greece.

The length of the forewings is 3–3.5 mm. The ground colour of the forewings consists of basally pale and distally grey scales forming a mottled appearance. Along the fold, they are pale grey and there is a longitudinal streak extending to two-thirds of the wing length.

References

Moths described in 2014
helia
Moths of Europe